The term piano duo can refer both to a genre of music, written for two pianists to play at either one or two pianos, or to the two pianists themselves.

This is a list of notable performers who appeared as piano duos in classical music. Most of these pianists performed works for piano four-hands (two pianists at one piano; also known as piano duet) as well as works for two pianos, often with orchestras or chamber ensembles. Some of these teams focussed exclusively or predominantly on this repertoire, but some also appeared separately as solo pianists.

Some piano duos appear under a single name (such as the Long Island Piano Duo), or a unified name (such as Nettle & Markham), but the majority simply use both their names (such as Katia and Marielle Labèque or Bracha Eden and Alexander Tamir).

People in this list should not be added to List of classical pianists unless they also had significant careers as solo pianists. However, if they recorded music requiring two pianists, they should be added to List of classical pianists (recorded).

List of classical piano duos

Sorting note The main entry is sorted by the pianist whose surname appears earlier in the alphabet, and the other pianist is cross-referenced in smaller type. Where their names are usually referred to in a different order, or they use a special name for their duo, that entry appears in the 2nd column.

References

 
 
Piano duo